Quercus paxtalensis is a species of oak endemic to Mexico.

Description
Quercus paxtalensis is a tree which grows from 12 to 18 meters tall, and occasionally to 30 meters tall.

Range and habitat
Quercus paxtalensis is found in the mountains of southern Mexico, including the Sierra Madre Oriental, Sierra Madre de Oaxaca, and Sierra Madre del Sur of Hidalgo, Oaxaca, Tamaulipas and Veracruz states, and the Chiapas Highlands and Sierra Madre de Chiapas of Chiapas state.

This species is native to montane forests, including cloud forest, oak forest, pine–oak forest, and high-elevation tropical dry forest from 1,100 to 1,800 meters elevation. It is associated with Clethra sp., Liquidambar styraciflua, Quercus corrugata, Quercus delgadoana, and Podocarpus matudae.

Subpopulations tend to be small. The species is threatened with habitat loss from frequent fires, livestock grazing, and logging.

References

Endemic oaks of Mexico
Cloud forest flora of Mexico
Flora of the Sierra Madre Oriental
Flora of the Sierra Madre de Oaxaca
Flora of the Sierra Madre del Sur
Flora of the Chiapas Highlands
Sierra Madre de Chiapas